Brocchinia canariensis is a species of sea snail, a marine gastropod mollusk in the family Cancellariidae, the nutmeg snails.

Distribution
This marine species occurs off the Canary Islands.

References

 Rolàn, E. & Hernandez, J.M., 2009. Nueva informacion sobre el genero Brocchinia (Gastropoda, Cancellariidae) en Canarias. Revista de la Academia Canaria de Ciencias 20(3–4)("2008"): 103–109

Cancellariidae
Gastropods described in 2009